Aladdin's Problem is a 1983 novella by the German writer Ernst Jünger. It tells the story of an East German former army officer who battles with the problem that man is alone in the world. An English translation by Hilary Barr was published in 1992.

Reception
Philip Brantingham wrote in the Chicago Tribune: "As a narrative, the novel is a failure; not much happens and the characters are flat. But as an enquiry it succeeds by posing problems about the future of the individual in a society dominated by technocrats." Publishers Weekly described the book as an "elegant allegorical novel" and wrote: "Lucid sentences and a finely tuned plot balance a rigorous agenda concerned with nothing less than the mysteries and paradoxes of material existence."

References

1983 German novels
German novellas
German-language novels
Novels by Ernst Jünger